The 2007 Tulsa Golden Hurricane football team represented the University of Tulsa in the 2007 NCAA Division I FBS football season. The team's head coach was Todd Graham, in his first year at Tulsa. They played home games at Skelly Field at H. A. Chapman Stadium in Tulsa, Oklahoma and competed in the West Division of Conference USA.

Schedule

References

Tulsa
Tulsa Golden Hurricane football seasons
LendingTree Bowl champion seasons
Tulsa Golden Hurricane football